The men's shot put event at the 1992 World Junior Championships in Athletics was held in Seoul, Korea, at Olympic Stadium on 18 and 19 September.  A 7257g (Senior implement) shot was used.

Medalists

Results

Final
19 September

Qualifications
18 Sep

Group A

Group B

Participation
According to an unofficial count, 21 athletes from 14 countries participated in the event.

References

Shot put
Shot put at the World Athletics U20 Championships